Sorkhanlu (also Romanized as Sorkhānlū) is a village in Arshaq Sharqi Rural District, in the Central District of Ardabil County, Ardabil Province, Iran. At the 2006 census, its population was 215, in 53 families.

References 

Towns and villages in Ardabil County